Ahangar Kola (also Romanized as Āhangar Kolā and Āhangar Kalā) is a village in Sharq va Gharb-e Shirgah Rural District, North Savadkuh County, Mazandaran Province, Iran. At the 2006 census, its population was 529, in 153 families.

References 

Populated places in Savadkuh County